Milijana Sakić (born 1988) is a politician in Serbia. She was elected to the National Assembly of Serbia in the 2020 parliamentary election as a member of the Serbian Progressive Party.

Private career
Sakić holds a degree in Serbian language and literature from the University of Novi Sad. She teaches at the technical school in Loznica.

Politician

Municipal politics
Sakić received the thirtieth position on the Progressive Party's electoral list for the Loznica city assembly in the 2016 Serbian local elections and was elected when the list won a majority victory with thirty-four mandates. She did not seek re-election at the local level in 2020.

Member of the National Assembly
Sakić received the 116th position on the Progressive Party's Aleksandar Vučić — For Our Children list in the 2020 parliamentary election and was elected when the list won a landslide majority with 188 mandates. She is now a member of the committee on the rights of the child and the committee on education, science, technological development, and the information society; a deputy member of the health and family committee; a member of Serbia's delegation to the Parliamentary Assembly of the Francophonie (where Serbia has observer status); and a member of Serbia's parliamentary friendship groups with France, Japan, Portugal, Russia, Spain, and Switzerland.

References

1988 births
Living people
People from Loznica
Members of the National Assembly (Serbia)
Members of the Parliamentary Assembly of the Francophonie
Serbian Progressive Party politicians
University of Novi Sad alumni
Women members of the National Assembly (Serbia)